William E. "Bill" Brunk (born 1928) was an American astronomer and NASA administrator.

He was educated at high school in Cleveland, Ohio and attended the local Case Institute of Technology in 1948, gaining a B.S. in 1952 and an M.S. in Astronomy in 1954.

He worked as a research scientist and aeronaut in the Lewis Flight Propulsion Laboratory from 1954 until 1958, before moving to the NASA Lewis Research Center as an aerospace research engineer, working there from 1958 to 1964.

He returned to the Case Institute in 1963 to earn his Ph.D. in astronomy, before accepting the position of staff scientist for the Voyager mission (1964-1965). He was then acting Chief (1965) and later Program Chief of Planetary Astronomy at NASA headquarters (1965-1982), where he played an important role in the construction of the 2.6-m reflector at the McDonald Observatory and the Infrared Telescope Facility at Mauna Kea.

He retired from NASA in 1985.

Honors and awards
1995 Harold Masursky Award for Meritorious Service to Planetary Science
 Minor planet 2499 Brunk, discovered in 1978, was named in his honor.

References

External links 

 Oral history interview transcript for William E. Brunk on 21 July 1983, American Institute of Physics, Niels Bohr Library & Archives - Session I
 Oral history interview transcript for William E. Brunk on 9 August 1983, American Institute of Physics, Niels Bohr Library & Archives - Session II

1928 births
Living people
Scientists from Cleveland
American astronomers
Case Western Reserve University alumni